Skyline logging (or skyline yarding) is a form of  cable logging in which harvested logs are transported on a suspended steel cable (a cableway or "highline") from where the trees are felled to a central processing location.  

The skyline's cable loop runs around a drive pulley, generally at the central delivery end, and the return pulley at the collection end; the collection-end pulley may be moved radially to other locations within the constraints of the system, and may operate over large areas.

Individual logs are attached to the suspended cable by means of choker cables and carriages. A skyline yarder can pull in 5 to 10 logs at a time, using separate chokers. The pulleys are mounted on towers or cranes, other trees, ridges or, in rare cases, helium balloons.

See also
 Cable logging

External links
Riding High: Skyline Logger Committed to Conservation
Skyline logging carriage

Log transport
Logging